Kamenitsa (also transcribed as Kamenitza or Kamenica, from the word kamen – "stone" and the suffix -itsa) is the name of several locations in Bulgaria:

Kamenitsa, Blagoevgrad Province, a village in Strumyani Municipality, in Blagoevgrad Province
, a village in Mirkovo Municipality, in Sofia Province
Kamenitsa Peak (Pirin) in the Pirin Mountains
Kamenitsa Peak (Balkan Mountains) in the Balkan Mountains
, a river in northern Bulgaria, tributary of the Vit
Kamenitsa (Rilska River), a river in western Bulgaria, tributary of Rilska River
, a region in western Bulgaria
, a basin in western Bulgaria
Kamenitsa (neighbourhood), a residential neighbourhood of Plovdiv
the former village of Kamenitsa, today a part of Velingrad
Kamenitsa (village), a small village in Peloponnese, Arcadia, Greece

See also
 Kamenitza
 Kamenitza (Geomorphology) are closed depressions that develop on rock surfaces in karst regions formed by dissolution weathering.
 Kamenica (disambiguation)
 Kamenicky (disambiguation)